Tenebrionini is a tribe of darkling beetles in the family Tenebrionidae. There are at least 20 genera in Tenebrionini.

Genera
These genera belong to the tribe Tenebrionini:

 Ariarathus Fairmaire, 1891  (the Palearctic and Indomalaya)
 Athrodactyla Klug, 1833  (tropical Africa)
 Bius Dejean, 1834  (North America and the Palearctic)
 Bouchardandrus Steiner, 2016  (North America)
 Bremerus Ferrer, 2004  (tropical Africa)
 Cedrosius Fairmaire, 1902  (tropical Africa)
 Falsocalcar Pic, 1925  (tropical Africa)
 Gridellia Kammerer, 2006  (tropical Africa)
 Hipalmus Bates, 1870  (the Neotropics)
 Idiobates Casey, 1891  (North America)
 Microzophobas Pic, 1944  (the Neotropics)
 Neatus Leconte, 1862  (North America and the Palearctic)
 Neozophobas Ferrer, 2006  (the Neotropics)
 Paratoxicum Champion, 1894  (Australasia)
 Phanerops Solier, 1851  (the Neotropics)
 Rhinandrus Leconte, 1866  (North America and the Neotropics)
 Satanocalcar Pic, 1925  (tropical Africa)
 Tenebrio Linnaeus, 1758 (mealworm beetles)  (North America, the Palearctic, Indomalaya, Australasia, and Oceania)
 Trichotenebrio Ardoin, 1962  (tropical Africa)
 Zophobas Dejean, 1834  (North America, the Neotropics, and tropical Africa)

References

Further reading

 
 

Tenebrioninae
Taxa named by Pierre André Latreille